Saeed Al-Menhali (Arabic:سعيد المنهالي) (born 4 February 1994) is an Emirati footballer. As of June 2020, he has made 29 appearances. He has been involved with the UAE Olympic national football team.

References

Emirati footballers
1994 births
Living people
Al Ain FC players
Al-Ittihad Kalba SC players
Footballers at the 2014 Asian Games
UAE Pro League players
Association football fullbacks
Asian Games competitors for the United Arab Emirates